The IESE Cities in Motion Index is a study published annually by the business school of the University of Navarra (IESE) that aims to evaluate the development of the world's cities. It assesses several socioeconomic aspects of development, including human capital, social cohesion (which includes employment, female participation in the work force, etc.), governance, sustainable development, mobility and transportation, urban planning, international outreach, and technology. The most recent version, published in 2019, examines 174 cities across 80 countries.

2019 ranking
The list according to the 2019 ranking.

See also
 City development index

References

External links
 Homepage

International rankings
Comparative economic systems